Pindara Private Hospital (or simply known as Pindara), is an acute medical, surgical and maternity hospital servicing the northern end of the Gold Coast. Pindara is the largest private hospital in the city, with 348 licensed beds, 17 operating theatres and a 24-hour emergency/ cardiac centre.

Facility services 
 24-hour Emergency and Cardiac Centre 
 Cardiac and Coronary care
 Obstetrics, Gynecology and IVF
 Pediatrics
 Ear Nose and Throat (ENT), Orthopedic, Breast, Obesity, Colorectal, Plastic and vascular surgery
 Neurosurgery and Neuro intervention 
 Respiratory medicine supported by a lung function laboratory
 Gastroenterology supported by a dedicated Endoscopy unit
 Urology
 Gynecology
 General Medicine 
 Day Oncology 
 Renal Dialysis unit
 Chronic Pain unit
 Rehabilitation unit
 Day Procedure

Location 
Pindara Private Hospital is located just off Benowa Road, on Allchurch Avenue, Benowa, Gold Coast. Pindara is only 4 kilometers from Surfers Paradise and provides a multi story car park for visitors and patients.

Public Transport 
Surfside Buslines route 741 Southport - Broadbeach South Station has a stop approximately 5 minutes walk away from the main entrance of the hospital, the bus stop is located opposite the St Kevins Catholic Primary on Benowa Road.

History

Early History 
Built by Allen and Gwen Ramsay, Pindara Private Hospital opened to the public in 1971 offering 50 beds and 3 operating theatres. in 1987 the first private emergency department in Australia was established. in the 1990s the hospital went under numerous expansions and renovations. The operating theaters were upgraded with the number increased to 5m which opened in 1993. A 47-bed wing, catering for maternity and surgical needs was established in 1995. in 1998 the Pindara Day Procedure Centre was opened.

2000s - Now 
2004 saw a Cardiac lap opened and a 6th operating theatre. The upgrade/ refurbishment of the East Wing in 2007 added an extra 80 beds to the hospital. In 2009 stage 1 of the major redevelopment commenced adding; a 50-bed ward, four additional operating theatres, a suit of specialists' rooms and a brand new multi story car park. in 2014 stage 2 of the redevelopment was opened to the public officially being named the Dr David Lindsay Wing. The brand new 5 story wing features; 5 new wards - 2 new 29 surgical wards, a 24-bed Neurosciences unit and a 29-bed Oncology unit bring the total number of beds to 348. 2 new operating theatres and a state-of-the-art kitchen facilities was also included in the new wing. in 2015 the rehabilitation unit, Renal unit and Chronic pain unit also opened.

House Rules Emergency 
On House Rules season 5 in 2017, an accident was caused when renovating a Gold Coast couples' house, when Geek Twin Andrew dropped a sheet of glass on a skip bin and had suspected artery and nerve damage. The show's medic and paramedic contestants Sean and Ella provided first aid. Andrew was rushed into surgery at Pindara Private Hospital. No arteries were severed but he had damage to the nerves and tendon.

References 

 Facility Services - http://www.pindaraprivate.com.au/About%20Us/About%20Pindara%20Private%20Hospital Retrieved 13 March 2016
 Location - http://www.pindaraprivate.com.au/About%20Us/Location Retrieved 13 March 2016
 Public Transport -   Retrieved 30 July 2019
 History - http://www.pindaraprivate.com.au/About%20Us/History Retrieved 13 March 2016

1971 establishments in Australia
Hospitals established in 1971
Hospitals in Queensland
Buildings and structures on the Gold Coast, Queensland
Private hospitals in Australia